The concept of backward masking originated in psychoacoustics, referring to temporal masking of quiet sounds that occur moments before a louder sound.

In cognitive psychology, visual backward masking involves presenting one visual stimulus (a "mask" or "masking stimulus") immediately after a brief (usually 30 ms) "target" visual stimulus resulting in a failure to consciously perceive the first stimulus. It is widely used in psychophysiological studies on fear and phobias that investigate the preattentive nonconscious reactions to fear-relevant stimuli.

It is unknown how a later stimulus is able to block an earlier one. However, one theory for this phenomenon, known as the dual channel interaction theory, proposes that a fast signal created by the second stimulus is able to catch up to and overcome a slower signal sent from the first impulse.  A similar phenomenon can occur when a masking stimulus precedes a target stimulus rather than follows it: this is known as forward masking, or visual forward masking when the stimulus is visual. While not consciously perceived, the masked stimulus can nevertheless still have an effect on cognitive processes such as context interpretation. It has been shown that visually masked stimuli can elicit motor responses in simple reaction-time tasks (e.g. response priming) independent of their conscious visibility.

It is a widespread belief that masked stimuli can be used for psychological manipulation (see subliminal messages, psychorama). However, the empirical evidence for subliminal persuasion is limited.

References

Audiology
Hearing
Acoustics
Psychoacoustics